The Virginia Slims of New Orleans is a defunct WTA Tour affiliated women's tennis tournament played from 1984 to 1988. It was held in New Orleans, Louisiana in the United States and was played on indoor carpet courts in the Lakefront Arena from 1984 to 1987 and on outdoor hard courts in 1988.

Results

Singles

Doubles

References
 WTA Results Archive

External links

 
Hard court tennis tournaments
Tennis
1984 establishments in Louisiana
1988 disestablishments in Louisiana
Defunct tennis tournaments in the United States